Achyutananda (Nepali:अच्युतानन्द) was a Nepali inventor. He was born in 1851. His family name is not known, it could be Pande, Lamichhane or Wagle. It is believed that he made some kind of flying device that could fly for a distance of about 200 m in the test flight. The claim however is disputed. He was banned from conducting his works by the Rana regime and sent to Benaras.

He also created a steam powered bamboo cart based on his experience of trains in India during the British Raj. It took him 20 years to do it.

References

Nepalese inventors
19th-century Nepalese people